Saint-Laurent-les-Bains (Auvergnat: Sant Laurenç daus Banhs) is a former commune in the Ardèche department in southern France. On 1 January 2019, it was merged into the new commune Saint-Laurent-les-Bains-Laval-d'Aurelle.

Population

See also
Our Lady of the Snows (Trappist monastery)
Communes of the Ardèche department

References

Former communes of Ardèche
Ardèche communes articles needing translation from French Wikipedia
Populated places disestablished in 2019